Michael K. Farr is an American author, CNBC contributor, and president of the DC investment advisory firm, Farr, Miller, & Washington. He has written three books, A Million Is Not Enough: How to Retire With the Money You'll Need, The Arrogance Cycle, and Restoring Our American Dream, which came out in 2013. Farr received a Next Generation Indie Books Finalist Award for Restoring Our American: The Best Investment in the category of Current Events/Social Change.

Business career 
Michael K. Farr is president and majority owner of Farr, Miller & Washington, LLC. He is Chairman of the Investment Committee and is responsible for overseeing the day-to-day activities of the firm. Prior to starting the firm, he was a Principal with Alex. Brown & Sons. Farr is also a member of the Economic Club of Washington, the Young President's Organization, and the Washington Association of Money Managers. He is also the Chairman of the Sibley Memorial Hospital Foundation.

Influence in financial media 

Farr is a paid contributor on CNBC television  as well as a recurring commentator for The Today Show, Good Morning America, NBC's Nightly News, CNN, Bloomberg, Reuters, and the Nightly Business Report on PBS.

He is often heard on Associated Press Radio, CBS Radio and National Public Radio and has been quoted in the Wall Street Journal, Forbes, Fortune, The Washington Post, Businessweek, USA Today, and many other publications.  His market blogs can be found on CNBC.com, HuffingtonPost.com  and Politico.com.

The forward of The Arrogance Cycle was written by P. J. O'Rourke, the American political satirist, journalist, writer, and author.

Publications

References

External links 
Company Website

American business writers
Living people
1961 births